Fobello is a comune (municipality) in the Province of Vercelli in the Italian region Piedmont, located about  northeast of Turin and about  northwest of Vercelli.

Fobello borders the following municipalities: Alto Sermenza, Bannio Anzino, Carcoforo, Cervatto, Cravagliana,  Rimella, and Rossa.

The  automotive engineers Vincenzo Lancia (1881–1937) and his son Gianni Lancia (1924–2014) were from Fobello.

References

External links
Photos

Cities and towns in Piedmont